Queens College (QC) is a public college in the Queens borough of New York City. It is part of the City University of New York system. Its 80-acre campus is primarily located in Flushing, Queens. It has a student body representing more than 170 countries.

Queens College was established in 1937 and offers undergraduate degrees in over 70 majors, graduate studies in over 100 degree programs and certificates, over 40 accelerated master's options, 20 doctoral degrees through the CUNY Graduate Center, and a number of advanced certificate programs. Alumni and faculty of the school, such as Arturo O'Farrill and Jerry Seinfeld, have received over 100 Grammy Award nominations.  

The college is organized into seven schools: Aaron Copland School of Music, Graduate School of Library and Information Studies, School of Arts & Humanities, School of Earth and Environmental Sciences, School of Education, School of Math and Natural Sciences, and School of Social Sciences. Queens College competes in Division II of the NCAA and sponsors 15 men's and women's championship-eligible varsity teams.

History

Before 1937

Before Queens College was established in 1937, the site of the campus was home to the Jamaica Academy, a one-room schoolhouse built in the early 19th century, where Walt Whitman once worked as teacher. The building was located on Flushing-Jamaica Road (later renamed Kissena Boulevard). Jamaica Academy became public in 1844. In 1909, the New York Parental School, a home for troubled boys, opened on the land surrounding the future site of Queens College and incorporated Jamaica Academy on its campus. Buildings such as Jefferson Hall (named after Thomas Jefferson) were used as both dormitories and classrooms.

In 1934, the New York Parental School was investigated amid rumors of abuse. The school was shut down and students were transferred to local public schools. A few months later, the grounds were turned over to the city. The city planned to house 500 mental patients from Randall's Island Hospital, who were temporarily displaced by the construction of the Triborough Bridge.

Founding

Meanwhile, County Judge Charles S. Colden appointed and chaired a committee to assess the feasibility of opening a free college in Queens. In September 1935, the committee recommended the establishment of such a college. Mayor La Guardia backed the recommendation and pushed for the free college's creation. In March 1937, the Board of Education designated the site of the former Parental School to be the future location of Queens College. Paul Klapper, former dean of the School of Education at City College of New York, was appointed the new college's president. The college opened in October 1937—later than anticipated due to a painters' strike—with 21 members on its teaching staff and 400 students in its inaugural freshmen class. The school's colors of blue and silver were selected by a "Color Committee" drawn from the entering class of students, and were announced at the first school dance, which was held on Wednesday, November 24, 1937. Around 1,200 students enlisted in the American military during World War II; fifty-nine would be killed in action.

The Motto 
Queens College's motto is "Discimus ut serviamus," which translates to "We learn so that we may serve." With public service for the common good on his mind, Prof. Konrad Gries created the motto in 1937 to inspire the first class of students and the following generations.

Late 20th century 
The college campus grew as buildings were constructed and enrollment increased. But changes beyond growth were in store for Queens College: in 1970, CUNY adopted the controversial policy of Open Admissions, which guaranteed a place at CUNY for any high school graduate in New York, regardless of traditional criteria like grades or test scores. The program was intended to offer college education to more New York City residents, in particular those of color. But Open Admissions did not seem to affect Queens College as much as it did other schools — a year after its implementation, only 10% of its student body was black or Puerto Rican, according to the newly appointed college president, Dr. Joseph S. Murphy. In 1973 enrollment at Queens reached an all-time high of 31,413 students. By 1976 new concerns overtook the college as New York City faced a crippling financial crisis. CUNY's policy of free tuition was revoked; the overall CUNY budget was cut by $135 million; and CUNY Chancellor Robert Kibbee demanded that Queens College slash its budget by 15%. Some faculty members resigned in protest. The New York Times reported in December 1976 that "Queens College, considered the jewel in the university's crown, has been particularly hard hit by the cuts, which have gone to the heart of the faculty." All hiring and building on campus was halted.

By 1984 student enrollment had declined to 15,000. But with a $175 million building program in place by 1986 for the college's 50th anniversary, enrollments were expected to rise and the college was beginning to recover from the financial crisis of the 1970s. In addition, the student body, in accordance with the mission of the short-lived Open Admissions program, had grown much more diverse, and college faculty were trained to understand Latin American culture and how to teach American literature to non-native students. By that time, former Queens College president Dr. Joseph S. Murphy was CUNY Chancellor. In the 1990s, the college attracted high-profile researchers to its faculty, including the virologist Luc Montagnier. Under President Allen Lee Sessoms, the college underwent some growth but also some missteps, including the highly publicized inability to fund the planned AIDS research center that Dr. Montagnier had been hired to lead.

Involvement in the Civil Rights Movement
Queens College students were active participants in the Civil Rights Movement of the 1960s, including the March on Washington for Jobs and Freedom in 1963. The most well-known student activist was Andrew Goodman, who was slain in Mississippi in 1964 with two other young men, James Chaney, and Michael Schwerner; all three were trying to register African Americans to vote in the South. Schwerner and Chaney were on the organizing staff of CORE; Goodman was a Freedom Summer volunteer. The three activists were stopped and arrested for allegedly driving over the speed limit on a Mississippi road. After being brought into the sheriff's department and released, the three young men were stopped by two carloads of Ku Klux Klan members on a remote rural road. The men approached their car, then shot and killed all three young men. The murders received national attention, and six conspirators were brought to trial and convicted by federal prosecutors for civil rights violations. The Chaney-Goodman-Schwerner Clock Tower of Rosenthal Library, a highly visible borough landmark, is named in their honor.

In February 2011, Queens College inherited the personal collection of the late James Forman. The collection, along with other civil rights leaders' collections, is available online at the Queens College Civil Rights Archive. A special program on February 17, 2011, included a presentation by the Honorable Julian Bond for Black History Month, as well as a formal announcement of the acquisition.

21st century
The college campus continued improving its facilities. Under a $1 billion CUNY-wide improvement program, Queens College's Powdermaker Hall was given a $57 million renovation, begun in 2000.

By 2014, enrollment was 20,000 students, half of whom come from minority backgrounds.

Dr. Felix V. Matos Rodriguez was appointed president of Queens College by the CUNY Board of Trustees in 2014. On May 1, 2019, Dr. Matos Rodriguez became the new Chancellor of the City University of New York as the first Latino and first minority educator to head the university in its 172-year history. William Tramontano served as QC's interim president from 2019 until July 1, 2020, when Frank H. Wu succeeded him as the new college president.

Campus and facilities

The 80-acre campus, located off Kissena Boulevard, is on a 100-foot-high hill that gives a fine view westward towards Manhattan.  However, despite occasional claims to the contrary, it is not on the highest point in Queens. Six of the original Spanish-style buildings dating back to the early 20th century still stand, such as Jefferson Hall, which was built in 1907.  The college has since expanded to over 40 buildings, including the main classroom building, Powdermaker Hall, rebuilt in 2003 and named after the college's distinguished anthropologist Hortense Powdermaker.

Queens College is one of two CUNY colleges that participates in Division II sports (the other is The College of Staten Island). A Child Development Center, staffed by professionals, offers inexpensive child care services to students with children. 

The Godwin-Ternbach Museum, which houses more than 6,000 works of art, is located in Queens College's Klapper Hall, named after the former school president, Paul Klapper. The outdoor plaza in front of the museum hosts a site-specific installation by Vito Acconci titled, “More Balls For Klapper Hall” (or “Untitled”). Klapper Hall also houses the Fine Arts and English Departments, and boasts the largest ceramics studio within the CUNY system. Other facilities in this building include a metal working studio, wood shop, black and white darkroom, student gallery and a suite of art studios for BFA and MFA candidates.

The college holds courses at several off-campus locations, including the 43rd Street Extension Center in Manhattan and the CUNY Center for Higher Education in downtown Flushing, which opened in late 2003.

The college has a low-rise 506-bed residence hall on campus called the Summit Apartments, which opened in late 2009. This makes Queens College one of only three CUNY campuses with dorm facilities (the other two being Hunter College and City College).

The college is home to the Aaron Copland School of Music (named for Aaron Copland), which is located in the Music Building. The Music Building also houses the music library and the 490-seat LeFrak Concert Hall.

CUNY School of Law was previously located to the west of the campus of Queens College; while it was always a separate administrative unit of CUNY, the building itself read "CUNY School of Law at Queens College," and was once a building for the Department of Education. The CUNY Board of Trustees approved plans for the Law School to be relocated to 2 Court Square in Long Island City, with the first semester of classes held in 2012. Queens College has since taken over the former Law School building, now named Queens Hall and home to the college's language departments.

Townsend Harris High School and John Bowne High School are located at the edge of the Queens College campus.

The Kupferberg Center for the Arts 
The Kupferberg Center for the Arts is home to Colden Auditorium, Goldstein Theatre, and the Ethel & Samuel Lefrak Concert Hall. Trevor Noah, Jerry Seinfeld, David Bowie, Patti LaBelle and Johnny Mathis, The Byrds, Victor Manuelle, Cesar Millan, and El Gran Combo have performed at Colden.

Benjamin Rosenthal Library

The campus maintains the Benjamin Rosenthal Library. The library's Chaney-Schwerner-Goodman Clocktower was named after the three civil rights workers who were murdered in 1964, including Andrew Goodman, a Queens College student. Built in 1988, the library contains over 800,000 books, 32,600 print and electronic materials, the electronic archives, a collection of multimedia materials in its Media Center and an art center. The library is also home to the Louis Armstrong archives.

The Art Library and the Queens College Art Center are on the sixth floor of Rosenthal. The Art Library has over 70,000 books; 5,000 bound periodicals; and 110,000 slides, pictures, and exhibition catalogs and pamphlets. The collection includes resources for the study of all aspects of the visual arts and material culture, including art and architectural history, theory, criticism, materials, techniques, and practice.

Nurtured by both the Aaron Copland School of Music and the Queens College Library, the Music Library has evolved into a first-class research facility and is the largest music collection in the CUNY system. The Music Library is located on two levels in the School of Music building and contains over 35,000 scores, 30,000 books, and 20,000 sound recordings, including the David S. Walker Music Education Collection and the Ursula Springer Choral Music Collection.

Godwin-Ternbach Museum
Since 1957 Queens College has been collecting works of art, these collections were initially used for teaching purposes and were meant to serve the college community. The collections were eventually brought together with the establishment of the Godwin-Ternbach Museum in 1980. The museum is now a part of the Kupferberg Center for the Arts, which has joined all the works of art on campus in collaborations of visual, performance, dance, and theater arts. In the early 1990s, the museum was downsized due to budget cuts. Over the next few years, the college kept it open but on a reduced budget and staff. In 2001, however, the college hired Amy Winter as director of the museum. To address the concerns of the museum Winter turned to MAP (The Museum Assessment Program); as a result not only did the museum improve its facilities but increased its collections-related staff as well. Today the museum is an integral part of Queens College that serves not only the faculty and staff but the community at large.

The museum, located in Klapper Hall, maintains a fine collection of 6,000 pieces of art, as well as artifacts from all cultures dating from ancient times to the modern day. These include works by Rembrandt Van Rijn, Pablo Picasso, Henri Matisse, and Georges Braque. The museum also hosts a series of exhibitions each year. These exhibitions and events are free and open to the public.

Residence

Queens College's first residence hall, the Summit Apartments, opened in 2009. This low-rise, 506-bed facility is located in the middle of the campus. Queens College is still primarily a commuter school, as only 500 of its over 19,000 students live on campus. The building has a gold certificate from the Leadership in Energy and Environmental Design (LEED), an organization that certifies buildings to have met environmentally sustainable construction standards. Queens College's residence hall offers study lounges on each floor, wireless internet, laundry services, and a state of the art fitness center. The Summit Apartments also includes kitchens with full-size appliances, as well as dining areas, microwaves, couches, entertainment stands, and music practice rooms.

In addition to the Summit, many students rent apartments off campus in the surrounding neighborhoods.

Transportation
Queens College operates a free shuttle service for students from campus (next to the Student Union building) to major transportation hubs in Flushing and Jamaica. The shuttle service also transports students from the Kissena end of campus to the Main Street end. The shuttle operates seven days a week.

Academics

Rankings

 In The Princeton Review's 2012 edition of "America's Best Value Colleges," Queens College was ranked eighth in the United States.
 In 2008, Queens College was ranked as one of the "25 Hottest Universities" in the Newsweek/Kaplan 2008 College Guide.
 In 2013, Queens College was ranked #2 nationally in Washington Monthly's "Best Bang For Your Buck" college guide.
In 2015, Queens College was included in The Princeton Review's list of top 322 green campuses.
In 2020, Queens College was ranked #4 as one of the "24 Colleges with the Best Return on Investment" by Business Insider.

Degrees and programs
Queens College is a liberal arts college that offers undergraduate degrees in 78 majors, over 100 master's degrees, over 40 accelerated master's options, 20 doctoral degrees through the CUNY Graduate Center, and a number of advanced certificate programs. It is also one of seven participating schools in the CUNY Macaulay Honors College. Queens College has a Freshman Honors Program, as well as a program called TIME 2000 for future math educators. The college's Professional & Continuing Studies program offers non-credit courses in such fields as health care, real estate, and risk management.

There are seven schools within the college: Aaron Copland School of Music, Graduate School of Library and Information Studies, School of Arts & Humanities, School of Earth and Environmental Sciences, School of Education, School of Math and Natural Sciences, and School of Social Sciences.

The Aaron Copland School of Music

The Aaron Copland School of Music is one of the oldest departments at Queens College, founded when the college opened in 1937. The department's curriculum was originally established by Edwin Stringham, and a later emphasis on the analytical system of Heinrich Schenker was initiated by Saul Novack. It offers undergraduate and graduate degrees.

Graduate School of Library and Information Studies (GSLIS)

GSLIS is an American Library Association accredited program and the only public school of library science in New York City. The school offers a Master of Library Science (MLS), MLS School Media Specialist, and dual MLS/MA in history degree paths. Additionally, the school offers two professional certificates, one in Children and Young Adult Services as well as one in Archives, Records Management, and Preservation.

Starting as a program within the education department at Queens College in 1955, GSLIS began issuing MLS degrees in 1965. It achieved status as a separate school for graduate studies within Queens College in 1979. In 2002, the school opened its Children and Young Adult Services certificate and, in 2003, its Archives, Records Management, and Preservation certificate.

Academic centers and institutes

The college is home to many centers which focus their research on various pressing social issues facing the local communities, students, faculty and the many ethnic and religious groups of the Queens area.

 Asian American/Asian Research Institute: Works to integrate the talents of individual faculty and the resources of other CUNY institutes to create a community of scholars to help focus their energies on Asia and the Asian American experience.
 Asian/American Center: Dedicated to community-oriented research that analyzes the multi-cultural diaspora experience of Asians in global and local communities.
 John D. Calandra Italian American Institute: Fosters higher education among Italian-Americans and ensures that the legacy of the Italian-American experience is documented and preserved for future generations. This is accomplished through research, counseling, lectures, symposia, and administering an exchange program with CUNY and Italian universities.
 Barry Commoner Center for Health and the Environment (formerly Center for the Biology of Natural Systems): . Recent projects include a study of the impact of air pollution on asthma sufferers in the South Bronx and a continuing examination of the health workers involved in the cleanup of ground zero after the terrorist attacks of September 11, 2001.
 Center for Byzantine and Modern Greek Studies: Initiates, supports, and coordinates the teaching of Byzantine and modern Greek studies. The center also promotes Byzantine and Neo-Hellenic scholarship and publications, and relates academic research and teaching to the needs of the Greek community in Queens and elsewhere.
 Center for Jewish Studies: Through outreach and research, the Center for Jewish Studies serves as a bridge between the academic program and the social community. Its Ibrahim Leadership and Dialogue Fellowship program, the only trip to bring students to both Israel and Saudi Arabia, is run partly through the Center for Jewish Studies.
 John Cardinal Newman Club: Run by the Catholic Newman Center, this area provides a social environment for all students of all faiths.
 Center for the Improvement of Education: Builds relationships between public schools and Queens College.
 The Michael Harrington Center for Democratic Values and Social Change: Promotes public discourse about social issues, advocates for social change, and works in partnerships with others to build a more just and equitable democratic society.  The institute is primarily concerned with the employment, health, and educational needs of economically disadvantaged communities.
 The Neuroscience Research Center:The center has programs at both the undergraduate and graduate levels. Members of the center have established a five-year NIH MARC program at the college for minorities in the biomedical research sciences. The faculty at the center have produced over 800 peer-reviewed publications over the past fifteen years, with nearly 300 in the past five years alone.  Since 1990, the center faculty have also received funding for 51 external and 54 internal grants.
 Queens College Model United Nations Team: Run in conjunction with the Political Science Department, this program provides students the opportunity to explore their interests in the international policy and the United Nations.
 Queens Memory Project: The Queens Memory Project, a digital archive which aims to record and preserve contemporary history across the borough of Queens, is a collaborative effort between Queens College and Queens Library that includes digitized materials from the Rosenthal Library's Department of Special Collections.
 The Center for Ethnic, Racial and Religious Understanding: CERRU was created in fall 2009 through a grant from the US Department of Education. CERRU is a non-partisan organization that facilitates cross-cultural engagement

Student life

Demographics

Queens College students represent 170 countries and speak over 90 different native languages. This rich variety has influenced Queens College's curriculum, research, and outreach programs.

Clubs
Queens College has over 100 different clubs and organizations, ranging from fraternities/sororities to cultural, religious, technology, and art clubs. Most of the organizations are located within the Student Union building. To complement the college's educational mission, the Student Union provides various facilities, services, co-curricular activities, and programs.

After one year as the "Israel Business Club", a small group of Queens College students successfully achieved chapter status in the TAMID Group. The TAMID Group (formerly '"TAMID Israel Investment Group"') is a student-led, apolitical, and areligious organization on 35 elite U.S. college campuses that provides experiential learning and leadership opportunities to 2,000+ students through hands-on interaction with the Israeli economy.

Greek life

Queens College Greek life consists of eight fraternities and seven sororities. Greek membership numbers in the hundreds, with more members in Greek Life than in all the other clubs on campus combined. The Queens College Greek life supports a variety of different philanthropies with thousands of dollars in donations to various charitable organizations, as well as thousands of hours of volunteer work. The Dining Hall is a popular gathering place for Greeks, as is the field directly outside during good weather. They hold events such a Greek Week, Fall Brawl, and Meet the Greeks, where they showcase their respective organizations, as well as compete for recreation.

Athletics

Queens (NY) athletic teams are the Knights. The college is a member of the Division II level of the National Collegiate Athletic Association (NCAA), primarily competing in the East Coast Conference (ECC, formerly known as the New York Collegiate Athletic Conference until after the 2005–06 school year) since the 1989–90 academic year. The Knights previously competed in the City University of New York Athletic Conference (CUNYAC) at the Division III level from 1978–79 to 1979–80.

Queens compete in 15 intercollegiate varsity sports: Men's sports include baseball, basketball, cross country, soccer, tennis and track & field; while women's sports include basketball, cross country, dance, soccer, softball, swimming & diving, tennis, track & field and volleyball. The longest running among these programs are the men's basketball and baseball teams.

Men's basketball
The men's basketball team has put a team on the court in every season since its inception in 1938. On February 14, 2004, the team played its 1500th game and, in those 1500 games, has produced twenty 1,000-point scorers. Of these twenty players, twelve have achieved this after the college began play in NCAA Division II in 1983 and three of these players: Alan Hevesi (#5), Norman Roberts (#15) & Geoff Maloney (#22) have had their numbers retired. Although the program has a long-running record of achievement, its biggest successes have come in the 21st century. In 2001 the Knights earned their first NCAA Division II Northeast Regional bid. A year later the team earned its second consecutive bid along with the program's first NYCAC championship. In 2005 the team once again was crowned NYCAC Champions and received an automatic bid to the NCAAs.

Baseball
With the exception of three years during World War II, the baseball program, like men's basketball, has fielded a team since 1938. In both 1967 and 1976 the team captured the Knickerbocker Conference championship, and in 1981 it won the CUNY championship. Their championships in 1976 and 1981 also earned them NCAA Division III tournament bids. More recently, the squad captured the NYCAC regular season championships in 1997 and 1998, the NYCAC tournament championship in 1998 and a bid to the NCAA Division II Northeast Regional. Seven players have been drafted and nine players have gone on to play professionally with organizations including the New York Yankees, Philadelphia Phillies, Chicago White Sox and Kansas City Royals. The latest of these draftees is 1998 All-American Justin Davies who, after playing in the Toronto Blue Jays organization for two seasons, has spent four years (2000–2004) as on outfielder for the Long Island Ducks of the Independent League.

Women's basketball
The women's basketball team has also experienced success. On March 24, 1973, the Knights, who were ranked #2 in the country, took the FitzGerald Gymnasium court with the AIAW (Association for Intercollegiate Athletics for Women) National Championship at stake. On February 22, 1975, they played in the first women's basketball game ever played in Madison Square Garden. Three players from this era (Debbie Mason (#15), Gail Marquis (#25) and Althea Gwyn (#31)) have had their numbers retired. On January 4, 2015, the two teams played in the Maggie Dixon Classic as a commemoration of the 40th anniversary of the original event. In the 2000s, the team has rebounded from a short down period to make a return to the NYCAC playoffs while producing several top-flight players, including Honorable Mention All-American in Carolyn Burke. In 2014 and 2015, under the Leadership of Bet Naumovski, the women's team won ECC Championships and advanced to the second round of NCAA postseason play in 2015.

Softball
In the period from 1997 to 2003, the softball team posted a .640 winning percentage and won 30 or more games in a season three times. One of those 30 win seasons came in 1999 when the team won their first NYCAC tournament championship and earned their first NCAA bid. Two season later, third team All-American Cheryl Cosenzo helped lead the Lady Knights to their second NYCAC championship as well as an NCAA bid and in 2002 the team earned their third Northeast Regional bid in five years. The Knights rose back to prominence in 2015, winning the ECC Championship under Head Coach Amy Delmore. Queens would make appearances in the NCAA Tournament in 2014 & 2015.

Tennis
The women's tennis team has experienced 19 consecutive winning seasons. The team has won four conference championships, while its players have won a number of individual and doubles titles. In 2004 Dominika Bajuk was selected as NYCAC Player of the Year. The Lady Knights have also earned NCAA Division II post-season championship bids in 2002, 2003, 2004, and 2005; as well as in 1995 when, as hosts, they won their region. Marilyn Aschner, who became a professional tennis player, played for the school.

Track and field
The men's track and field team won back-to-back ECC Championships in 2013 and 2014. In May 2022, the college completed renovation on its running track and two soccer fields. The nearly $10 million project was paid for through a combination of state and city funding.

Notable alumni and faculty

List of alumni

In television

 Carrie Heffernan – Took courses for law during season 3 of King of Queens
 Eric Murphy – Fictional television character from Entourage, attended for two years before dropping out to become Vincent Chase's manager
 Betty Suarez – Fictional television character from Ugly Betty, graduated in 2005 with a BFA in Media
 Law and Order – Two episodes were partially shot at Queens College; areas used were the Quad, Rosenthal Library (stacks), Colwin Hall (a lab), and Jefferson Hall (printing shop and an office).
 Law and Order SVU – NYPD Detective Elliot Stabler, the late poet Jacob Gerrety, disgraced art patron Sandra Dunbar, and children's author Natalie Beck were all alumni of Queens College
 Boiler Room – Fictional characters Seth Davis, was a Queens College dropout; Lou Pearlman attended and graduated with a degree in accounting.
 Actor Riz Ahmed has said that he would sneak into classes at Queens in order to work on his New York accent for a role

Seinfeld

 Seinfeld – Fictional characters George Costanza and Jerry Seinfeld attended Queens College. In the show, Jerry can be seen wearing a Queens College hat and T-shirt

References

External links 

 
 Official athletics website

 
Universities and colleges in Queens, New York
Kew Gardens Hills, Queens
1937 establishments in New York City
Educational institutions established in 1937
Universities and colleges on Long Island